Zendaya Maree Stoermer Coleman (born September 1, 1996) is an American actress and singer. She has received various accolades, including a Golden Globe Award and two Primetime Emmy Awards. TIME magazine named her one of the 100 most influential people in the world on its annual list in 2022.

Born and raised in Oakland, California, Zendaya began her career as a child model and backup dancer. She made her television debut as Rocky Blue on the Disney Channel sitcom Shake It Up (2010–2013) and starred as the titular character in the sitcom K.C. Undercover (2015–2018), for the channel. Her feature film debut came in 2017 with the superhero film Spider-Man: Homecoming, and she later starred in its sequels. Zendaya's role as Rue Bennett, a struggling drug addicted teenager, in the HBO teen drama series Euphoria (2019–present) made her the youngest recipient of two Primetime Emmy Awards for Outstanding Lead Actress in a Drama Series. Her film roles include the musical The Greatest Showman (2017), the romantic drama Malcolm & Marie (2021), and the science fiction epic Dune (2021).

In addition to her acting career, Zendaya has ventured into music. In 2011, she released the singles "Swag It Out" and "Watch Me", the latter a collaboration with Bella Thorne. She signed with Hollywood Records in 2012. Her eponymous debut studio album (2013) was released to moderate success. The album's lead single, "Replay", reached the top 40 on the U.S. Billboard Hot 100 chart. Zendaya's biggest commercial success as a musician came with her Zac Efron collaboration, "Rewrite the Stars", from The Greatest Showman soundtrack in 2017. The single reached within the top 20 of several record charts and has received multi-platinum sales certifications globally.

Early life
Zendaya Maree Stoermer Coleman was born on September 1, 1996, in Oakland, California, to teachers Claire Stoermer and Kazembe Ajamu Coleman. Her father is African-American, with roots in Arkansas; her mother has German and Scottish ancestry. Zendaya, whose name derives from the Shona name Tendai (meaning "to give thanks"), has five older siblings. She attended Fruitvale Elementary School, where her mother taught for two decades. At age six, she and two friends from the school performed a play there for Black History Month. She grew as a performer in part at the nearby California Shakespeare Theater in Orinda, California, where her mother worked a summer job as the house manager. She helped her seat patrons, sold fundraising tickets, and was inspired by the theatrical performances to pursue acting. At eight, Zendaya joined a hip-hop dance troupe called Future Shock Oakland and was a member for three years. She also spent two years dancing hula with the Academy of Hawaiian Arts.

Zendaya attended Oakland School for the Arts and, while still a student, was cast in several roles in area theaters. At the Berkeley Playhouse, she played Little Ti Moune in Once on This Island, and in the TheaterWorks' production in Palo Alto, she played a character originally written as male, Joe, in Caroline, or Change. Reviewing the latter, Keith Kreitman of San Mateo Daily Journal called the 11-year-old Zendaya's performance "a pure delight". She studied at the CalShakes Conservatory program and at the American Conservatory Theater.

Her stage credits include performances in several of William Shakespeare's plays. She played Lady Anne in Richard III, Celia in As You Like It, and took part in a production of Twelfth Night. When Zendaya was in seventh grade, the family moved to Los Angeles. In 2015, while pursuing an acting career, she graduated from Oak Park High School.

Career

2009–2015: Early career with Disney

Zendaya began her career working as a fashion model for Macy's, Mervyns, and Old Navy. She was featured in an iCarly toys ad. She also appeared as a back-up dancer in a Sears commercial featuring Disney star Selena Gomez. In 2009, she was a featured performer in the Kidz Bop music video for its cover of the song "Hot n Cold" by Katy Perry, which was released on Kidz Bop 15. In November 2009, she auditioned for the role of CeCe Jones in the Disney sitcom Shake It Up (titled Dance Dance Chicago at the time). For her audition, she performed Michael Jackson's "Leave Me Alone". She was selected to play Rocky Blue. Shake It Up premiered on November 7, 2010, and was watched by 6.2 million viewers, becoming Disney Channel's second highest-rated premiere in Disney Channel's 27-year history.

In 2011, Zendaya released "Swag It Out", a promotional independent single. She also starred in the book trailer for "From Bad To Cursed" by Katie Alender. In June of the same year, she released "Watch Me", performing with Bella Thorne. The song peaked at 86 on the Billboard Hot 100. The second season of Shake It Up premiered on September 18, 2011. Zendaya hosted Make Your Mark: Ultimate Dance Off 2011 on Disney Channel. In 2011, Target stores began selling D-Signed, a line of clothing inspired by the clothes worn by Zendaya and other cast members of Shake It Up.

Zendaya's first film role was in Frenemies (2012), a Disney Channel Original Movie. On February 29, 2012, "Something to Dance For" was released as promotional single for Live 2 Dance. For the soundtrack, Zendaya also recorded three other songs: "Made In Japan", "Same Heart", and "Fashion Is My Kryptonite", released as promotional single. In June 2012, Shake It Up was renewed for a third and final season. On September 2, 2012, she signed to Hollywood Records. In October, she performed at the Teen Music Festival and at the Operation Smile benefit. Zendaya was as one of the celebrities who would compete on season 16 of Dancing with the Stars. At 16, she was the youngest contestant ever to participate on the show, before Willow Shields succeeded her at 14 on season 20. She was partnered up with professional dancer Valentin Chmerkovskiy. In May, the couple finished as runners-up behind Kellie Pickler and Derek Hough.

Zendaya's self-titled debut album was released on September 17, 2013. It was preceded by the single "Replay", released on July 16, 2013, written by Tiffany Fred and Paul "Phamous" Shelton. In August 2013, she was cast as 16-year-old Zoey Stevens, the lead character in the Disney Channel Original Movie Zapped, whose "smart phone begins to somehow control all the boys around her".
In November 2013, Zendaya was selected as Elvis Duran's Artist of the Month and was featured on NBC's Today, where she performed live her single "Replay". That same month, she was cast as the lead in a Disney Channel pilot called Super Awesome Katy. It was ordered to series by Disney Channel in May 2014, with the series now under the title K.C. Undercover, and with Zendaya's character now named K.C. Cooper rather than Katy Cooper. Zendaya exerted influence over the renaming of her character and the retitling of the series, also deciding several key elements of the character's personality. K.C. Undercover premiered on Disney Channel on January 18, 2015, and was renewed for a second season in May 2015.

In 2014, Zendaya was a guest judge on an episode of Project Runway: Under the Gunn. In the episode, the contestant designers were given the challenge of creating an outfit for Zendaya to wear in an upcoming concert performance. In February 2015, after a joke made by Giuliana Rancic concerning Zendaya, in reference to her hair smelling of "patchouli oil" and "weed" at the 87th Academy Awards, Zendaya promptly took to Instagram to address the remark and point out that many successful people have "locs," a hairstyle that has nothing to do with drugs. Mattel honored Zendaya with her own Barbie, replicating her Oscars look. The doll belongs to Mattel's Barbie "Sheroes" project, which honors inspirational living women. The following month, musician Timbaland confirmed that he was working with Zendaya on her second album, following her switching record labels from Disney to Republic. "Something New", featuring Chris Brown was released on February 5 via Hollywood Records and Republic Records. The song also marks it as her first official release since signing to Republic Records.

2016–present: Film breakthrough, Euphoria, and transition to adult roles

In December 2016, Zendaya appeared as a guest judge in the season finale of the 15th season of the reality television series Project Runway. She made her feature film debut as Michelle in the superhero film Spider-Man: Homecoming, which was released in July 2017. Zendaya wore no makeup to her screen test, a decision that was carried through in production, and "add[ed] her own embellishments to the role, such as carrying around a mug of herbal tea". The film grossed $117 million in its first weekend, ranking number one at the box office. John DeFore of The Hollywood Reporter praised her as a "scene stealer", while David Ehrlich of IndieWire called her the film's "MVP", despite her brief screen time. In August 2016, she appeared in the music video for the song "Versace on the Floor" by Bruno Mars.

In December 2017, Zendaya co-starred in the original musical film The Greatest Showman. She portrayed a trapeze artist who falls in love with Zac Efron's character at a time when interracial romance was taboo. Owen Gleiberman of Variety praised her chemistry with Efron. The Hollywood Reporter praised Zendaya for "[registering] strongest, bringing touching sensitivity to her handful of scenes". She appeared on three tracks of the film's soundtrack, including "Rewrite the Stars". The film met mixed reception but became the third-highest grossing live-action musical ever released.

In September 2018, Warner Bros. released the animated film Smallfoot, in which Zendaya voiced the yeti Meechee. She also sang two songs for the soundtrack. The film received positive reviews. In June 2019, Zendaya began starring in the HBO drama series Euphoria, an adaptation of the Israeli series of the same name, as Rue, a 17-year-old drug addict and the narrator of the series. Ben Travers of IndieWire wrote that she "adds heartbreaking levity to moments when her spiraling character feels invincible instead of fragile". The Guardians Rebecca Nicholson called her performance "astonishing" and "mesmerizing". For her performance, she won the Primetime Emmy Award for Outstanding Lead Actress in a Drama Series, becoming the youngest winner of the award. She would also win Performer of the Week from TVLine for the week of February 6, 2022, for her performance in the second-season episode "Stand Still Like the Hummingbird". Also in 2019, she reprised her role as MJ in Spider-Man: Far from Home. Critic Christy Lemire called Zendaya's portrayal "darkly alluring" and praised her "humorous, deadpan charm". The film was a commercial success, becoming the fourth highest-grossing release of the year.

In 2021, Zendaya starred in Malcolm & Marie, which was filmed during the first phase of the COVID-19 pandemic. The production complied with extensive safety protocols and had a lean crew to minimize health risks. The film co-stars John David Washington, and was directed by Sam Levinson, who also created Euphoria. Zendaya allocated shares to the film to everyone involved in its making, as a way of offering a financial bonus when the movie was sold. Part of the proceeds was shared with Feeding America. The film had a mixed reception but Zendaya's performance was positively reviewed. Brian Truitt of USA Today described her as "luminous" and "absolute fire", Richard Brody called her performance “the movie’s only redeeming quality”, and Varietys Peter Debruge praised her for "wear[ing] Marie's fragility on the surface, only to reveal the character’s strength through reaction shots and silence".

She next voiced the character of Lola Bunny in Space Jam: A New Legacy. Growing up with the first film since childhood, Zendaya drew on her experiences with her family's love of basketball for the role. Zendaya then played Chani in Denis Villeneuve's science fiction film Dune, the first part of a two-part adaptation of the 1965 novel of the same name. Critic Glenn Kenny dubbed her portrayal "better than apt", while Brian Lowry of CNN noted that her role was limited to "gauzy images" in the protagonist's visions. Zendaya reprised her role as MJ for the third time in Spider-Man: No Way Home. RogerEbert.coms Brian Tallerico praised Zendaya and Tom Holland's chemistry as well as her execution of MJ's "emotional final beats".

Having already collaborated with Labrinth on the song "All for Us" for Euphoria'''s first season, in 2022 Zendaya co-wrote two songs ("I'm Tired" and "Elliot's Song") for the second season, also performing as a vocalist on the former. Receiving continued acclaim for her performance as Rue, the second season of Euphoria earned her four Emmy nominations. Nominated for Lead Actress in a Drama for the second time, she became the youngest two-time nominee in Emmy history, while her nomination as an executive producer for Outstanding Drama Series made her the youngest woman ever nominated for producing. She received two nominations for Outstanding Original Music and Lyrics for her lyrical contributions to the show's soundtrack. In 2023, Zendaya won the Golden Globe Award for Best Actress – Television Series Drama at the 80th Golden Globe Awards and received a Screen Actors Guild Awards nomination.

Upcoming projects

Zendaya will next star in and produce Challengers, a sports drama directed by Luca Guadagnino. She will also reprise her role as Chani in the sequel Dune: Part Two.

Other ventures
Fashion and business

Zendaya was the face of Beats Electronics, X-Out, Material Girl, CoverGirl, and Chi Hair Care. In August 2013, she released her debut book, Between U and Me: How to Rock Your Tween Years with Style and Confidence to "help girls through the tougher parts of the tween years". In August 2015, she introduced a shoe collection called Daya, which was her childhood nickname. In November 2016, Zendaya's clothing line Daya by Zendaya went on sale. The second collection was gender-fluid and included full range of sizes. In October 2018, she became Tommy Hilfiger brand's ambassador and co-designed Tommy x Zendaya capsule collections. She took inspiration from the '70s, namely the decade's "strong, iconic women", and her runway shows at Paris Fashion Week and New York Fashion Week have been praised for celebrating diversity and inclusivity including women of colour, plus-size models, and models aged up to 70. The shows were a tribute to the pioneering model icons. In 2019, Zendaya became a spokesmodel for Lancôme, and in the following year for Bulgari and Valentino. In June 2022, Zendaya was announced as the global brand ambassador of Glaceau SmartWater.

Zendaya was ranked one of the best-dressed women in 2018 by fashion website Net-a-Porter. For the September 2020 InStyle issue she and her stylist, Law Roach, chose to use all black designers, artists, and creatives. In October 2020, she won the Visionary Award at the CNMI Green Carpet Fashion Awards for "promoting diversity and inclusion in fashion and film".

Philanthropy and advocacy
Zendaya has lent her support to several charities and causes. In 2012, she became an ambassador for Convoy of Hope and encouraged fans to support Hurricane Sandy response efforts. The following year, she promoted other relief efforts. In 2014, Zendaya recorded John Legend's song "All of Me" with a portion of the proceeds going to the organization. The same year, she celebrated her 18th birthday with a campaign to help feed at least 150 hungry children in Haiti, Tanzania and the Philippines through feedONE, and in 2016, she celebrated her 20th birthday with a campaign to raise $50,000 to support Convoy's Women's Empowerment Initiative. In October 2012, Zendaya performed at the medical Operation Smile benefit. She was UNICEF's Trick-or-Treat 2014 campaign spokesperson. In July 2015, she visited South Africa with UNAIDS, the United Nations programme dedicated to preventing and creating access to treatment for HIV and AIDS. Then she also held a fundraiser with CrowdRise, with proceeds going to non-profit, community based, Ikageng charity in Soweto for a family of AIDS orphans. When Malcolm & Marie, filmed during the pandemic, was sold in September 2020, a portion of the proceeds was shared with Feeding America.

Zendaya supports campaigns to raise awareness about underserved communities, underprivileged schools and to financially support schools. In September 2017, she partnered with Verizon Foundation as a spokesperson for their national #WeNeedMore initiative to bring technology, access and learning opportunities to children. She was also empowering them to pursue careers in STEM. In March 2018, Zendaya teamed up with Google.org to give back to students at community school in Oakland funding an innovative computer science curriculum.

Zendaya is a feminist. In January 2017, she attended the Women's March on Washington to showcase her support of women's rights. She has previously discussed her experience as a black female in Hollywood. She uses her social platforms to address racial justice, voting, body shaming, and bullying. She has been showing support for the Black Lives Matter movement on her social media accounts for years; she took part in the George Floyd protests in June 2020 and temporarily lent her Instagram account to Patrisse Cullors to share anti-racism resources and media. Zendaya has been an advocate for voting over the years. In October 2016, she was one of the celebrities to participate in "Vote Your Future" initiative and appeared in a campaign video. In September 2020, she encouraged her fans with Michelle Obama, and her "When We All Vote" nonpartisan  organization, to check their voter registration ahead of elections. The next month, she shared a video while casting her vote to remind about voting again. In October 2013, she took part in P&G's movement called Mean Stinks, and co-hosted the nationwide live-streamed assembly joined by almost 500 schools. In September 2017, she was fronting, along with her Spider-Man: Homecoming costars, a PSA for awareness campaign Stomp Out Bullying.

Zendaya also supported American Heart Association, City Year, Communities in Schools, DonorsChoose.org, Children Mending Hearts, Toys for Tots, Friends for Change and Donate My Dress, among others.

Awards and recognition

In 2020, at age 24, she became the youngest recipient of the Primetime Emmy Award for Outstanding Lead Actress in a Drama Series, winning for her role as Rue Bennett in the HBO drama series Euphoria. After winning the award again at the 2022 Primetime Emmy Awards, she became the youngest two-time acting winner.

Zendaya was featured on Forbes 30 Under 30 in 2016. She was included on Time magazine's annual list of the 100 most influential people in the world in 2022. In the same year, Variety magazine ranked her on its list of the 500 most influential figures in global media.

 Personal life 
Zendaya owns a home in Los Angeles and a condo in Brooklyn. She is a vegetarian, saying: "my main reason for being a vegetarian is that I'm an animal lover—definitely not because I love vegetables". As of November 2021, Zendaya is in a relationship with her Spider-Man co-star Tom Holland.

Filmography
Film

Television

Music videos
As lead artist

As featured artist

 As guest appearance 

 Video games 

Discography

 Zendaya'' (2013)

Concert tours
 Swag It Out Tour (2012–2014)

Opening act
Summer Tour  (2014)

References

External links

 
 
 

 
1996 births
Living people
21st-century African-American women singers
21st-century American actresses
Actresses from Los Angeles
Actresses from Oakland, California
African-American actresses
American child actresses
American child singers
American women pop singers
American film actresses
American people of German descent
American people of Scottish descent
American television actresses
American video game actresses
American voice actresses
Best Drama Actress Golden Globe (television) winners
Child pop musicians
Hollywood Records artists
Outstanding Performance by a Lead Actress in a Drama Series Primetime Emmy Award winners
Participants in American reality television series
Shorty Award winners
Singers from Los Angeles
Walt Disney Records artists